"Andy Warhol" is a song written by English singer-songwriter David Bowie in 1971 for the album Hunky Dory. It is an acoustic song about one of Bowie's early artist inspirations, the American pop artist Andy Warhol.

Background 
The album track opens with a series of strange electronic tones which fades into studio chatter in which producer Ken Scott mispronounces Warhol's name and Bowie repeatedly corrects him. Scott then solemnly reintroduces the take with the correct pronunciation, and Bowie asks if the tape is rolling. Upon realising he is indeed being recorded, Bowie bursts into laughter and the song proper begins.

The song is memorable for a distinctive repeated riff played by Mick Ronson on acoustic guitar.

Originally the song was written for Dana Gillespie, who recorded it in 1971, but her version of the song was not released until 1973 on her album Weren't Born a Man. Bowie produced Gillespie's version and Ronson also plays guitar. Gillespie performed the song in 1974 on the Dutch television programme TopPop.

Warhol's reaction 
Bowie, an admirer of Warhol, sent him a copy of Hunky Dory and performed "Andy Warhol" for him in person at Warhol's studio the Factory in New York in September 1971, before the album was released. But due to Warhol's typically minimal reaction, Bowie was never sure if he liked it. Tony Zanetta, who had brought Bowie to the Factory and later portrayed Warhol in Warhol's first play, Pork (1971), maintained that Warhol "didn't say anything but absolutely hated it".

Other releases 
The song was released as the B-side of the single "Changes" in January 1972. It also appeared on the Japanese compilation The Best of David Bowie from 1974. An edited version, with the dialogue in the introduction cut, as it was on the US single version, is included on Re:Call 1, part of the 2015 boxed set Five Years (1969–1973).

Live versions 
A performance sung by Dana Gillespie was recorded for BBC Radio's In Concert strand on 3 June 1971, presented by John Peel and first broadcast on 20 June that year. Bowie played this song at BBC's Sounds of the 70s with Bob Harris on 23 May 1972. This was broadcast on 19 June 1972, and in 2000 was released on the Bowie at the Beeb album. A performance recorded at Santa Monica Civic Auditorium on 20 October 1972 has been released on Santa Monica '72 and Live Santa Monica '72. The song was a 1972 regular performance, but it was not played again until the 1995 Outside Tour with Nine Inch Nails. One live performance from 1995 was released in 2020 on the live album Ouvre le Chien (Live Dallas 95). A November 1996 tour rehearsal recording of the song, which originally aired on a BBC radio broadcast in 1997, was released in 2020 on the album ChangesNowBowie.

Personnel 
David Bowie: lead and backing vocals, acoustic guitar, electronic sounds
Mick Ronson: acoustic guitar, percussion

Homages 
A riff from "Andy Warhol" (at 0'48") is quoted in Metallica's song Master of Puppets (at 6'19"). It is an homage made by Cliff Burton and Kirk Hammett to whom Bowie was a huge influence.

References

External links 
 

1971 songs
David Bowie songs
Cultural depictions of Andy Warhol
Song recordings produced by Ken Scott
Songs written by David Bowie
Song recordings produced by David Bowie